Henry Carr (1887 – 1942) was an English professional footballer who played as a forward for Sunderland. On 19 November 1910, Carr earned his first and last cap for the England amateur team in a match against Ireland in Belfast, as a last-minute replacement for Vivian Woodward. On his debut, he twice put his side in the lead, but his efforts weren't enough to prevent a 3–2 loss, which was the team's first-ever in the United Kingdom.

International goals 
England Amateurs score listed first, score column indicates score after each Carr goal.

References

1880s births
1942 deaths
People from South Bank, Redcar and Cleveland
English footballers
Association football forwards
South Bank F.C. players
Sunderland A.F.C. players
Middlesbrough F.C. players
Hartlepool United F.C. players
English Football League players